"Ivey's Wall" is a song written and recorded by Canadian singer-songwriter Bruce Guthro. It was released in 1998 as the third single from his second studio album, Of Your Son. It peaked at number 12 on the RPM Country Tracks chart in February 1999.

Chart performance

Year-end charts

References

1998 songs
1998 singles
Bruce Guthro songs
EMI Records singles